Cherryville is a small town in the Adelaide Hills, South Australia. It was named in around 1840 after the native cherry trees that grew in the area, although some historians claim that it was not named until 1892, when horticultural cherry plantings became widespread in the area.

Cherryville Post Office opened on 2 January 1899 and closed in 1974.

The town received national attention in May 2013 when the 2013 Cherryville bushfire burnt out  of scrub and farmland surrounding the district. The fire was notable in that it occurred outside the fire-ban season, leading to calls to review the State's fire ban policy.

References

Suburbs of Adelaide